Vitrumidae is a family of tunicates belonging to the order Aplousobranchia.

Genera:
 Vitrum Kott, 2009

References

Aplousobranchia